The 74th Academy Awards ceremony, presented by the Academy of Motion Picture Arts and Sciences (AMPAS), took place on March 24, 2002, at the Kodak Theatre in Hollywood, Los Angeles. During the ceremony, AMPAS presented Academy Awards (commonly referred to as Oscars) in 24 categories honoring films released in 2001. The ceremony, televised in the United States by ABC, was produced by Laura Ziskin and directed by Louis J. Horvitz. Actress Whoopi Goldberg hosted the show for the fourth time. She first hosted the 66th ceremony held in 1994 and had last hosted the 71st ceremony in 1999. Three weeks earlier, in a ceremony held at the Regent Beverly Wilshire Hotel in Beverly Hills, California, on March 2, the Academy Awards for Technical Achievement were presented by host Charlize Theron.

A Beautiful Mind won four awards, including Best Picture. Other winners included The Lord of the Rings: The Fellowship of the Ring with four awards, Black Hawk Down and Moulin Rouge! with two, and The Accountant, For the Birds, Gosford Park, Iris, Monster's Ball, Monsters, Inc., Murder on a Sunday Morning, No Man's Land, Pearl Harbor, Shrek, Thoth, and Training Day with one. Despite a record length of four hours and twenty-three minutes, the telecast garnered nearly 42 million viewers in the United States.

Winners and nominees

The nominees for the 74th Academy Awards were announced on February 12, 2002, at the Samuel Goldwyn Theater in Beverly Hills, California, by Frank Pierson, president of the Academy, and the actress Marcia Gay Harden. The Lord of the Rings: The Fellowship of the Ring earned the most nominations with thirteen. It was the seventh film to earn that many nominations. A Beautiful Mind and Moulin Rouge! tied for second place with eight apiece.

The winners were announced during the awards ceremony on March 24, 2002. By virtue of its latest Best Picture victory for A Beautiful Mind, DreamWorks became the second film studio to release three consecutive Best Picture winners; the studio had previously released American Beauty and Gladiator. Denzel Washington was the second African-American to win Academy Award for Best Actor, following Sidney Poitier for 1963's Lilies of the Field. Nominated for their performances as the title character in Iris, Best Actress nominee Judi Dench, and Best Supporting Actress nominee Kate Winslet became the second pair of actresses nominated for portraying the same character in the same film.

Awards

Winners are listed first, highlighted in boldface, and indicated with a double dagger.

{| class=wikitable
| style="vertical-align:top; width:50%;"|

 A Beautiful Mind – Brian Grazer and Ron Howard, producers Gosford Park – Robert Altman, Bob Balaban and David Levy, producers
 In the Bedroom – Graham Leader, Ross Katz and Todd Field, producers
 The Lord of the Rings: The Fellowship of the Ring – Peter Jackson, Fran Walsh and Barrie M. Osborne, producers
 Moulin Rouge! – Martin Brown, Baz Luhrmann and Fred Baron, producers
| valign="top" width="50%" |Ron Howard – A Beautiful Mind
 Ridley Scott – Black Hawk Down
 Robert Altman – Gosford Park
 Peter Jackson – The Lord of the Rings: The Fellowship of the Ring
 David Lynch – Mulholland Drive
|-
| valign="top" |

Denzel Washington – Training Day as Alonzo Harris
 Russell Crowe – A Beautiful Mind as John Forbes Nash Jr.
 Sean Penn – I Am Sam as Sam Dawson
 Will Smith – Ali as Muhammad Ali
 Tom Wilkinson – In the Bedroom as Dr. Matthew Fowler
| valign="top" |

Halle Berry – Monster's Ball as Leticia Musgrove
 Judi Dench – Iris as Iris Murdoch
 Nicole Kidman – Moulin Rouge! as Satine
 Sissy Spacek – In the Bedroom as Ruth Fowler
 Renée Zellweger – Bridget Jones's Diary as Bridget Jones
|-
| valign="top" |

Jim Broadbent – Iris as John Bayley
 Ethan Hawke – Training Day as Officer Jake Hoyt
 Ben Kingsley – Sexy Beast as Don Logan
 Ian McKellen – The Lord of the Rings: The Fellowship of the Ring as Gandalf
 Jon Voight – Ali as Howard Cosell
| valign="top" |

Jennifer Connelly – A Beautiful Mind as Alicia de Lardé-Nash
 Helen Mirren – Gosford Park as Jane Wilson
 Maggie Smith – Gosford Park as Constance Trentham
 Marisa Tomei – In the Bedroom as Natalie Strout
 Kate Winslet – Iris as Iris Murdoch
|-
| valign="top" |

 Gosford Park – Julian Fellowes Amélie – Guillaume Laurant and Jean-Pierre Jeunet
 Memento – Christopher Nolan and Jonathan Nolan
 Monster's Ball – Milo Addica and Will Rokos
 The Royal Tenenbaums – Wes Anderson and Owen Wilson
| valign="top" |

 A Beautiful Mind – Akiva Goldsman based on the book by Sylvia Nasar Ghost World – Daniel Clowes and Terry Zwigoff based on the comic book by Daniel Clowes
 In the Bedroom – Rob Festinger and Todd Field based on the story "Killings" by Andre Dubus
 The Lord of the Rings: The Fellowship of the Ring – Fran Walsh, Philippa Boyens, and Peter Jackson based on the book by J. R. R. Tolkien
 Shrek – Ted Elliott, Terry Rossio, Joe Stillman, and Roger S. H. Schulman based on the book by William Steig
|-
| valign="top" |

 Shrek – Aron Warner Jimmy Neutron: Boy Genius – Steve Oedekerk and John A. Davis
 Monsters, Inc. – Pete Docter and John Lasseter
| valign="top" |

 No Man's Land (Bosnia and Herzegovina) in Bosnian – Danis Tanović Amélie (France) in French – Jean-Pierre Jeunet
 Elling (Norway) in Norwegian – Petter Ness
 Lagaan (India) in Hindi – Ashutosh Gowariker
 Son of the Bride (Argentina) in Spanish – Juan José Campanella
|-
| valign="top" |

 Murder on a Sunday Morning – Jean-Xavier de Lestrade and Denis Poncet Children Underground – Edet Belzberg
 LaLee's Kin: The Legacy of Cotton – Susan Froemke and Deborah Dickson
 Promises – Justine Shapiro and B.Z. Goldberg
 War Photographer – Christian Frei
| valign="top" |

 Thoth – Sarah Kernochan and Lynn Appelle Artists and Orphans: A True Drama – Lianne Klapper McNally
 Sing! – Freida Lee Mock and Jessica Sanders
|-
| valign="top" |

 The Accountant – Ray McKinnon and Lisa Blount Copy Shop – Virgil Widrich
 Gregor's Greatest Invention – Johannes Kiefer
 A Man Thing (Meska Sprawa) – Sławomir Fabicki and Bogumil Godfrejow
 Speed for Thespians – Kalman Apple and Shameela Bakhsh
| valign="top" |

 For the Birds – Ralph Eggleston Fifty Percent Grey – Ruairí Robinson and Seamus Byrne
 Give Up Yer Aul Sins – Cathal Gaffney and Darragh O'Connell
 Strange Invaders – Cordell Barker
 Stubble Trouble – Joseph E. Merideth
|-
| valign="top" |

 The Lord of the Rings: The Fellowship of the Ring — Howard ShoreA.I. Artificial Intelligence — John Williams
A Beautiful Mind — James Horner
Harry Potter and the Sorcerer's Stone — John Williams
Monsters, Inc. — Randy Newman
| valign="top" |

 "If I Didn't Have You" from Monsters, Inc. – Music and Lyrics by Randy Newman "May It Be" from The Lord of the Rings: The Fellowship of the Ring – Music and Lyrics by Enya, Nicky Ryan, and Roma Ryan
 "There You'll Be" from Pearl Harbor – Music and Lyrics by Diane Warren
 "Until..." from Kate & Leopold – Music and Lyrics by Sting
 "Vanilla Sky" from Vanilla Sky – Music and Lyrics by Paul McCartney
|-
| valign="top" |

 Pearl Harbor – George Watters II and Christopher BoyesMonsters, Inc. – Gary Rydstrom and Michael Silvers
| valign="top" |

 Black Hawk Down – Michael Minkler, Myron Nettinga and Chris Munro Amélie – Vincent Arnardi, Guillaume Leriche and Jean Umansky
 The Lord of the Rings: The Fellowship of the Ring – Christopher Boyes, Michael Semanick, Gethin Creagh and Hammond Peek
 Moulin Rouge! – Andy Nelson, Anna Behlmer, Roger Savage and Guntis Sics
 Pearl Harbor – Kevin O'Connell, Greg P. Russell, and Peter J. Devlin
|-
| valign="top" |

 Moulin Rouge! – Art Direction: Catherine Martin; Set Decoration: Brigitte Broch Amélie – Art Direction: Aline Bonetto; Set Decoration: Marie-Laure Valla
 Gosford Park – Art Direction: Stephen Altman; Set Decoration: Anna Pinnock
 Harry Potter and the Sorcerer's Stone – Art Direction: Stuart Craig; Set Decoration: Stephenie McMillan
 The Lord of the Rings: The Fellowship of the Ring – Art Direction: Grant Major; Set Decoration: Dan Hennah
| valign="top" |

 The Lord of the Rings: The Fellowship of the Ring – Andrew Lesnie Amélie – Bruno Delbonnel
 Black Hawk Down – Sławomir Idziak
 The Man Who Wasn't There – Roger Deakins
 Moulin Rouge! – Donald M. McAlpine
|-
| valign="top" |

 The Lord of the Rings: The Fellowship of the Ring – Peter Owen and Richard Taylor A Beautiful Mind – Greg Cannom and Colleen Callaghan
 Moulin Rouge! – Maurizio Silvi and Aldo Signoretti
| valign="top" |

 Moulin Rouge! – Catherine Martin and Angus Strathie The Affair of the Necklace – Milena Canonero
 Gosford Park – Jenny Beavan
 Harry Potter and the Sorcerer's Stone – Judianna Makovsky
 The Lord of the Rings: The Fellowship of the Ring – Ngila Dickson and Richard Taylor
|-
| valign="top" |

 Black Hawk Down – Pietro Scalia A Beautiful Mind – Mike Hill and Dan Hanley
 The Lord of the Rings: The Fellowship of the Ring – John Gilbert
 Memento – Dody Dorn
 Moulin Rouge! – Jill Bilcock
| valign="top" |

 The Lord of the Rings: The Fellowship of the Ring – Jim Rygiel, Randall William Cook, Richard Taylor and Mark Stetson'''
 A.I. Artificial Intelligence – Dennis Muren, Scott Farrar, Stan Winston and Michael Lantieri
 Pearl Harbor – Eric Brevig, John Frazier, Ed Hirsh and Ben Snow
|}

Academy Honorary Award
Sidney Poitier
Robert Redford

Jean Hersholt Humanitarian Award
Arthur Hiller

Films with multiple nominations and awards

Presenters and performers 

The following individuals (in order of appearance) presented awards or performed musical numbers.

Presenters

Performers

Ceremony information

The Academy wanted to find a new venue for the festivities amid limited seating and rehearsal time concerns with the Dorothy Chandler Pavilion. In addition, problems arose regarding staging the Oscars at the Shrine Auditorium because there was difficulty of directing guests from the auditorium where the main event took place to the adjacent Exhibition Hall for the Governor's Ball. In August 1997, AMPAS and Canadian development firm TrizecHahn went into negotiations over the development of an entertainment complex located on the corner of Hollywood Boulevard and Highland Avenue adjacent to the Mann's Chinese Theatre. Seven months later, both the Academy and TrizecHahn agreed on a twenty-year lease that allowed for the ceremony to be staged at a new venue, which would later be called the Kodak Theatre, located within the property which was also situated near the Hollywood Roosevelt Hotel site of the inaugural awards ceremony in 1929. This was the first time the ceremony was held in Hollywood since the 32nd ceremony took place at the Pantages Theatre in 1960.

In view of the return of the Oscars to Hollywood, the Academy hired film producer and Sony Pictures Entertainment chairman Laura Ziskin in September 2001 to oversee production of the telecast. Pierson explained the decision to hire Ziskin saying, "This show is one of the most difficult—if not the most difficult—producing jobs in show business. Laura Ziskin brings intelligence, experience and wit expressed in everything she has done." This marked the first occurrence that a woman produced the Oscars solo. Four months later, Whoopi Goldberg was selected as host of the 2002 ceremony. In an article in the Los Angeles Times, Ziskin justified her choice of Goldberg commenting that she has "great warmth, with humor, humanity and social conscience, all qualities that I feel are essential for this year's show. I look forward to collaborating with Whoopi to put on a meaningful and entertaining evening."

Furthermore, the September 11 attacks affected the telecast and its surrounding events. Despite speculation and suggestions that the festivities be postponed or canceled, AMPAS President Pierson wrote in a Variety column refusing to take such action stating that it would send the message that "the terrorists have won". However, due to security concerns the Academy announced that red carpet bleacher seats would now be limited on a reservation basis based on a random selection and a background check.

On Oscar night, Tom Cruise opened the show and stated that it was the job of filmmakers to make films during troubling times. In addition, later in the evening Goldberg introduced a "New York icon" to the stage and filmmaker and director Woody Allen, who had previously refused to attend a ceremony, made a surprise appearance. He was greeted with a hearty standing ovation from audience members including Baz Luhrmann, Ron Howard, Jennifer Connelly, Washington, and Ethan Hawke. He explained after the events that happened that September he was there to represent the city he so loved and to plead filmmakers to continue to film in New York City. Woody then presented a film montage created by fellow New Yorker and screenwriter Nora Ephron saluting New York City in film.

Several other people participated in the production of the ceremony. Actors Glenn Close and Donald Sutherland served as announcers during the show. The orchestra led by film composer and telecast musical supervisor John Williams, performed selections of film scores during a montage saluting film composers produced by Kyle Cooper. Filmmaker Errol Morris filmed a vignette featuring several famous people discuss movie memories. Director Penelope Spheeris produced a montage saluting 60 years of Oscar-winning documentary feature films. Cirque du Soleil performed a dance number inspired by movies and visual effects.

Introduction of Best Animated Feature award
Beginning with this ceremony, AMPAS introduced a new competitive award that would honor animated feature films. According to Academy communications director John Pavlik, the film must be at least 70 minutes in length, have a significant amount of animated characters, and be at least 75 percent animated in order to be qualified for consideration. A minimum of eight qualifying films must be released within the calendar year to permit a slate of three nominees. If the number of films exceeds twelve, the nominee roster increases to five. Prior to the introduction of this category, three Disney films (1937's Snow White and the Seven Dwarfs, 1988's Who Framed Roger Rabbit, and 1995's Toy Story) were all given Special Achievement Academy Awards.

Box office performance of nominated films
At the time of the nominations announcement on February 12, the combined gross of the five Best Picture nominees at the US box office was $484 million, with an average of $96.9 million per film. The Lord of the Rings: The Fellowship of the Ring was the highest earner among the Best Picture nominees with $271 million in domestic box office receipts. The film was followed by A Beautiful Mind ($113 million), Moulin Rouge! ($57.1 million), Gosford Park ($22.2 million), and finally In the Bedroom ($19.5 million).

Of the top 50 grossing movies of the year, 46 nominations went to 14 films on the list. Only The Lord of the Rings: The Fellowship of the Ring (2nd), Shrek (3rd), Monsters, Inc. (4th), A Beautiful Mind (15th), Black Hawk Down (25th), Jimmy Neutron: Boy Genius (27th), Training Day (29th), Bridget Jones's Diary (31st), Ali (41st), and Moulin Rouge! (44th) were nominated for Best Picture, Best Animated Feature, or any of the directing, acting, or screenwriting awards. The other top-50 box office hits that earned nominations were Harry Potter and the Sorcerer's Stone (1st), Pearl Harbor (7th), Vanilla Sky (19th), and AI: Artificial Intelligence (28th).

Critical reviews
The show received a mixed reception from media publications. Some media outlets were more critical of the show. Television critic Robert Bianco of USA Today complained that the awards ceremony was "intensely narcissistic and characteristically, almost unrelievedly, dull." Columnist Matthew Gilbert of The Boston Globe bemoaned that "TV's most-watched slug crawled back into town last night." He also sniped, "As usual, the technical awards formed a Bermuda triangle in the middle of the show, and the film-clip fests and production numbers numbed our brains." The Sacramento Bees Rick Kishman lamented that "It was the first time both best-acting Oscars went to African Americans...yet viewers had to fight hours and hours of boredom to care." He also quipped that the excessive amount of montage and tributes dragged down the proceedings.

Other media outlets received the broadcast more positively. Orange County Register film critic Henry Sheehan praised Goldberg's performance as hosting writing that her "ensuing entrance a la Moulin Rouge was a comparative triumph and her boom-boom-boom succession of jokes put the show right on track." Television columnist Joanne Ostrow of The Denver Post raved, "The nearly five-hour telecast was stunning, historic, slick, efficient, and helped along by some knockout clothes." She also commented that Washington and Berry's acceptance speeches and the Sidney Poitier tribute added to the historic and emotional mood of the festivities. John Levesque of the Seattle Post-Intelligencer commended producer Ziskin for producing "the best Oscar telecast this TV watcher can remember." In addition, he wrote that "It was clear the 74th Academy Awards ceremony was something special: fresh, crisp, different from its predecessors."

Ratings and reception
At four hours and 23 minutes, the ceremony was  the longest in history. The American telecast on ABC drew in an average of 41.82 million people over its length, which was a 3% decrease from the previous year's ceremony. The show also earned lower Nielsen ratings compared to the previous ceremony with 25.54% of households watching over a 40.34 share. In addition, it garnered a lower 1849 demo rating with a 16.13 rating over a 36.46 share among viewers in that demographic.

In July 2002, the ceremony presentation received seven nominations at the 54th Primetime Emmys. Two months later, the ceremony won one of those nominations for Debra Brown's choreography during the telecast.

In Memoriam
The annual In Memoriam tribute, presented by actor Kevin Spacey, honored the following people.

Jack Lemmon – Actor
Nigel Hawthorne – Actor
Beatrice Straight – Actress
Eileen Heckart – Actress
Jason Miller – Actor, writer
Ann Sothern – Actress
Harold Russell – Actor
Kim Stanley – Actress
Michael Ritchie – Director
Ted Demme – Director
Budd Boetticher – Director
Hiroshi Teshigahara – Director
Herbert Ross – Director
Julia Phillips – Producer
Jay Livingston – Composer
William Hanna – Producer
Chuck Jones – Animator
Samuel Z. Arkoff – Producer
Danilo Donati – Costume designer
Sacha Vierny – Cinematographer
John A. Alonzo – Cinematographer
Carroll O'Connor – Actor
Aaliyah – Actress
George Harrison – Producer, composer, actor
Anthony Quinn – Actor

Before the In Memoriam'' montage was shown, Spacey requested a moment of silence in memory of the victims of the September 11 attacks.

See also 

 8th Screen Actors Guild Awards
 22nd Golden Raspberry Awards
 44th Grammy Awards
 54th Primetime Emmy Awards
 55th British Academy Film Awards
 56th Tony Awards
 59th Golden Globe Awards
 List of submissions to the 74th Academy Awards for Best Foreign Language Film
 List of Academy Award records

References

Bibliography

External links
Official websites
 Academy Awards Official website
 The Academy of Motion Picture Arts and Sciences Official website
 Oscar's Channel at YouTube (run by the Academy of Motion Picture Arts and Sciences)

News resources
 Oscars 2002 BBC News
 Academy Awards coverage CNN

Analysis
 2001 Academy Awards Winners and History Filmsite
 Academy Awards, USA: 2002 Internet Movie Database

Other resources
 

2001 film awards
2002 in American cinema
Academy Awards ceremonies
2002 in California
March 2002 events in the United States
Academy
Television shows directed by Louis J. Horvitz
Impact of the September 11 attacks on cinema